Chrysocorythus is a genus of finches in the family Fringillidae.

It contains the following species:
 Indonesian serin (Chrysocorythus estherae)
 Mindanao serin (Chrysocorythus mindanensis)

References

Chrysocorythus
Bird genera